Red Wings Airlines is a Russian regional leisure airline based in Moscow Domodedovo Airport. The airline provides both scheduled passenger and cargo services.

History

Red Wings was founded in 1999 under the name VARZ-400, after the Russian acronym of the Vnukovo Avia Repair Factory. It was renamed Airlines 400 in 2001, before adopting its current name in 2007.

The airline was owned by Russian tycoon Alexander Lebedev, who wanted to create a discount airline using modern Russian Tupolev Tu-204-100B 210-passenger twin-jet airliners, both newly built and used. The company had a fleet of ten Tu-204-100Bs (an eleventh Tu-204 was written off after crashing at Vnukovo International Airport on 29 December 2012), and had also sought to acquire Airbus A320s and possibly Airbus A321s to complement its Tu-204 fleet.

Lebedev also owned 49% of German charter airline Blue Wings, which was to become Red Wings's sister company. However, on 13 January 2010, Blue Wings ceased all operations and filed for bankruptcy, citing the global financial crisis for a pull-out of investors.

After the crash of Flight 9268 in Vnukovo, Russian aviation authorities initiated an emergency check of airline operational activities and fleet maintenance, resulting in the revocation of the carrier's AOC, effective on 4 February 2013. The airline had ceased all operations the day before and owner Alexander Lebedev announced that no return to operation was planned.

On 4 April 2013, NRC sold Red Wings Airlines Group "Guta" for one symbolic ruble (in this case, leased aircraft remained with the lessor NRC-owned company "Ilyushin Finance"). The new owners of Red Wings planned to increase the fleet to 10–15 aircraft; the airline was only going to buy Russian aircraft. On 25 April 2013, Red Wings announced it would be headed by Sergey Belov—the previous CEO of the airline "Russia". On 18 June 2013, the Federal Air Transport Agency renewed Red Wings' commercial passenger and cargo transportation certificate. On 22 June, the airline resumed charter flights, and on 12 July, scheduled flights from Moscow.

To increase their business power, Red Wings and Nordavia decided to merge. But while the process was initiated, a date for finalization of the merger or clarification of the two airlines' future business relationship and branding identities was never announced. The plan called for Airbus A320 aircraft initially ordered by Nordavia to be delivered to Red Wings. The new brand name was to be announced after completion of the merger.

On 20 September 2018, Red Wings announced its re-branding; the first aircraft to arrive with the updated livery was to be the Airbus A321, set to arrive by the end of 2018.

In August 2021 Red Wings air company signed their first personal services 20-year contract to the value of 500 million dollars with United Aircraft Corporation in order to technical support of SSJ100 engines. Before, only engine's manufacturer, PowerJet company, could carry the right to sign any technical support contracts with air companies directly.

Destinations

Codeshare agreements 
Currently, Red Wings Airlines has only one codeshare agreement: 
Smartavia
Ural Airlines

Fleet

Current fleet

The Red Wings fleet consists of the following aircraft as of October 2022:

Retired fleet
Red Wings Airlines previously also operated the following types of aircraft:
Ilyushin Il-76 
Tupolev Tu-154
Tupolev Tu-204-100
Tupolev Tu 204-100B
Tupolev Tu-214 1 left in fleet after former long-term storage

Accidents and incidents
On 29 December 2012, at 16:35 local time (12:35 GMT), Red Wings Airlines Flight 9268, a Tupolev TU-204-100В (Registration: RA-64047, c/n: 1450743164047, s/n: 047, built: 2008) crashed on landing after overrunning runway 19 at Vnukovo International Airport (VKO) following a non-revenue repositioning flight originating from Pardubice Airport, Czech Republic. The aircraft broke up and came to a stop on elevated highway M3 about past the runway's end. There were eight crew members on board of whom five were killed and the other three seriously injured. The fatal Vnukovo accident was the second runway overrun incident involving a Red Wings operated TU-204-100B in nine days following a Moscow Vnukovo to Novosibirsk flight on 20 December 2012 that overran runway 25 at Tolmachevo Airport by  into an open field. Initial flight data recorder readouts indicate that brake failure as well as engine thrust reverser issues were major contributing causes in both overruns resulting in the issuance of additional airworthiness directives. Russia's Interstate Aviation Committee (IAC) later determined that, as in the precursor non-fatal overrun incident in Novosibirsk, the fatal Moscow accident was caused by a failure of the compression switches in two of the three landing gear assemblies to close on touchdown thus causing the engine thrust reverser shells to fail to deploy.
On 22 August 2018, one of the Aviadvigatel PS-90 engines of a Red Wings Tu-204 operating flight WZ808 from Ufa to Sochi experienced an engine surge during takeoff from Ufa International Airport and subsequently caught fire. The crew did not receive any fire indications, the automatic fire suppression system did not work, and the manual fire suppression failed to fully extinguish the flames. Emergency services put out the fire after landing while the passengers were evacuated through the right hand emergency doors via slides. There were no injuries. A Rosaviatsia (Russia's Civil Aviation Authority) commission has been set up to investigate the occurrence.

See also
List of airlines of Russia

References

External links

Red Wings Official website
Official website of Air 400 (Archive)

Airlines established in 1999
Companies based in Moscow
Charter airlines of Russia
Russian companies established in 1999